Grand Meadow may refer to:

Grand Meadow Township, Cherokee County, Iowa
Grand Meadow Township, Clayton County, Iowa
Grand Meadow Township, Mower County, Minnesota
Grand Meadow Township, South Dakota in Minnehaha County, South Dakota

Township name disambiguation pages